Brahmanapalli Balaiah was an Indian politician belonging to  Indian National Congress. He was elected as a member of Andhra Pradesh Legislative Assembly from Kamareddy in 1978. He died of heart attack on 21 February 2019.

References

1930 births
2019 deaths
Indian National Congress politicians
Members of the Andhra Pradesh Legislative Assembly
Indian National Congress politicians from Andhra Pradesh